The 2013–14 season was Gillingham's 121st season in their existence. Along with League One, the club competed in the FA Cup, League Cup, Football League Trophy and the regional Kent Senior Cup. The season covers the period from 1 July 2013 to 30 June 2015.

Transfers and loans

Transfers in

Transfers out

Transfer summary

Pre-season and friendlies

Competitions

Overall

League table

Results

FA Cup

Football League Cup

Football League Trophy

References

Gillingham
Gillingham F.C. seasons
2010s in Kent